Craig Eastman may refer to:

Craig Eastman (musician) in Kane (American band)
Craig Eastman (The Only Way Is Essex)